Ella baila sola is a Spanish musical duet formed by Marta Botía Alonso (Madrid, Spain, September 15, 1974) and Marilia Andrés Casares (Cuenca, Spain,  December 17, 1974). The group dissolved in 2001. The group is active right now touring Latin America with Marta, Marilia is not in the band anymore. As of April 2021, Marta & Marilia announced their reunion tour to commemorate the band's 25th anniversary.

History 
Marilia Andrés Casares and Marta Botía met while studying at Madrid's San Agustin School. Originally, the duo were dubbed ‘The Just’, and sang exclusively in English. However, once producer Gonzalo Benavides listened to a demo by the duo, he convinced them to begin singing in Spanish. Upon switching languages, the group also underwent a transformation of its own. The duo, now titled ‘Ella Baila Sola’ (inspired by the song ‘They Dance Alone’ by Sting) recorded its first self titled album in 1996. Their musical style consisted of a mix of Latin Cantautor, Latin Pop, Spanish Pop and Spanish Pop Rock. Just a year later, the group was awarded the ‘Best Spanish Band’ award at ‘Premios Amigos’. The group's debut album was a huge hit in Spain, selling over a million copies. The album also generally sold very well across Latin America. Songs such as ‘Lo echamos a suertes’ and ‘Amores de barra’ quickly became staple hits of the 1990s in Spain. To this date, the duo has toured places such as Mexico, Chile, America and Madrid. In the last months before the separation of ‘Ella Baila Sola’, the distance between the duo became increasingly evident as they avoided each other completely. Furthermore, After her departure from ‘Ella Baila Sola’ Marilia Andrés Casares continued to pursue her individual artistic passions and continued her career as a singer songwriter

Music 

Shortly after their first album in 1996, The duo released two more albums which furthered their success and notoriety in the Latin world. However, due to personal differences, in 2001, Marta and Marilia chose to part ways and pursue their own musical careers and lifestyles. Recently, after years of inactivity, Marta Botía relaunched the group with new member Rocío Pavón. With Pavón, ‘Ella Baila Sola’ released two new albums in 2009-2010 dubbed ‘Awake’ and ‘Grandes Exitos’. ‘Awake’ consisted of new music and a new tour across Spain, whilst ‘Grandes Exitos’ was a compilation of the duo's greatest hits from the 90's. In 2013 the band was dissolved and Rocío Pavón left the group after a collection of reproaches over Facebook. Soon after Pavón's departure, in 2015, Marta brought in María del Mar García (2015-2018) to accompany her on tours. Later, the group relaunched for a fourth time in 2018 with another new member, Virginia Mos and have recently hinted at new music.

Discography 
 Ella baila sola (1996)
 E.B.S. (1998)
 Marta y Marilia (2000)
 Grandes éxitos (2001)

Collaborations
 Mira que eres canalla Aute (Ella baila sola - Ay de ti, Ay de mí)
 Mujer (Ella baila sola - No sabes como sufrí || Todos - Hay que volver an empezar)
 Homenaje a Jesús de la Rosa (Marilia - Tu frialdad || Todos - Recuerdos de una noche)
 Elefantes (Elefantes & Marilia - Me gustaría hacerte feliz)
 Se vende (Tonxu & Marta Botía - Risk || Tonxu & Ella baila sola - El caprichoso)
 Vampiros en La Habana (Guaraná & Marta Botía - Échame a mí la culpa)

References 

 
 
 
 
 
 
 
 

Spanish pop music groups
Musical groups established in 1996
Musical groups disestablished in 2001
Latin pop music groups